Nathaniel Coleman (born January 1, 1997) is an American professional climber who won the silver medal in men's combined sport climbing at the Tokyo 2020 Olympics. He became the first American male climber to qualify for the Olympic Games after advancing to the final at IFSC Combined Qualifier Toulouse 2019 in November–December, 2019, a qualifying event for the 2020 Games in Tokyo. On June 17, 2020, Coleman added the first ascent of The Grand Illusion (8C+/V16) in Little Cottonwood Canyon, Utah (USA) to his list of accomplishments. 

From 2016 to 2018, Coleman won three straight USA Climbing Bouldering Open National Championships, and finished 2nd in the 2019 competition.  He also finished second in the 2019 Combined Invitational. Coleman won the 2020 USA Climbing Bouldering Open National Championships.  Coleman also finished 4th overall in bouldering at the 2015 IFSC Climbing World Cup, winning silver medals in Toronto and Vail.

As a youth competitor, Coleman won the age group events at the USA Climbing Youth Bouldering Nationals in 2012, 2014, 2015 and 2016.

At 14, Coleman took fourth at Youth Bouldering Nationals in Boulder, Colorado.

References

External links 

Living people
1997 births
People from Murray, Utah
American rock climbers
University of Utah alumni
Sportspeople from Utah
Olympic sport climbers of the United States
Sport climbers at the 2020 Summer Olympics
Medalists at the 2020 Summer Olympics
Olympic silver medalists for the United States in sport climbing